Gerard Carleton, BD was the second dean of Peterborough.

He graduated from Queens' College, Cambridge in 1524. He was rector of Stanway from 1531 to 1542; and a canon of Westminster from 1540 until his death in 1549.

Notes

Deans of Peterborough
Alumni of Queens' College, Cambridge
Canons of Westminster
1549 deaths